William Cowden (September 6, 1920 – October 17, 2007) was an American basketball player.

A  guard from Lowell High School in San Francisco, California, Cowden played collegiately for Stanford University with his Lowell teammate, Don Burness. In 1942, Cowden was team captain and led Stanford to the 1942 NCAA Championship, in which he played all 40 minutes and scored 5 points. He earned first-team All-PCC honors.

After his basketball career, Cowden worked for Pan Am and served as director of their Southeast Asia office. He and his wife Beverly had three sons. He is a member of the Stanford Athletic Hall of Fame. He died in San Francisco in 2007.

References

1920 births
2007 deaths
Basketball players from San Francisco
Guards (basketball)
Stanford Cardinal men's basketball players
American men's basketball players